Siphonops is a genus of caecilians in the family Siphonopidae. 
It contains the following species:
 Siphonops annulatus — ringed caecilian
 Siphonops hardyi — Hardy's caecilian
 Siphonops leucoderus — Salvador caecilian
 Siphonops paulensis — Boettger's caecilian, cutuchi

References

 
Amphibian genera
Amphibians of South America
Taxonomy articles created by Polbot